Amaia Peña de las Heras (born 22 November 1998) is a Spanish footballer who plays as a goalkeeper for Athletic Club.

Club career
Born in Getxo and raised in Portugalete, Peña started her career at Pauldarrak. She joined Athletic Club in 2014, appearing for their reserve team for two seasons. She then moved to the United States to study at the University of Pittsburgh, where she played for their NCAA Division I Women's Soccer Championship team, the Panthers. 

Upon completing her four-year degree course (in marketing and supply chain management) and returning to Spain in 2020, she again signed for Athletic, this time to compete for a place in the senior team with Andrea de la Nava (a former teammate at Pauldarrak), making six Primera División appearances in the 2020–21 season. With the arrival of Mariasun Quiñones that summer to be the first choice at Lezama, Peña joined Eibar on a one-year loan deal.

International career
Peña was a member of the Spain under-17 squad that qualified for the UEFA Women's Under-17 Championship in 2015 (Iceland), being named in the 'Team of the Tournament' as her team won the competition. She also played at the 2016 UEFA Women's Under-19 Championship  (Slovakia) in which Spain were the runners-up, and was in the squad for the 2016 FIFA U-20 Women's World Cup (Papua New Guinea), although she did not make an appearance with Mariasun Quiñones chosen as the starting goalkeeper.

References

External links
 
 Amaia Peña at La Liga
 
 
 

1998 births
Living people
Women's association football goalkeepers
Spanish women's footballers
Footballers from Getxo
Athletic Club Femenino B players
Athletic Club Femenino players
SD Eibar Femenino players
Primera División (women) players
Spanish expatriate women's footballers
Expatriate women's soccer players in the United States
Pittsburgh Panthers women's soccer players
Spanish expatriate sportspeople in the United States
Spain women's youth international footballers